The Decepticons are the main antagonists in the fictional continuities of the Transformers multimedia franchise. They are depicted as a faction of sentient robotic lifeforms led by Megatron, identified by a purple face-like insignia. Capable of transforming into alternate forms, these are often high tech or powerful vehicles; including aircraft, military vehicles, heavy equipment, ground combat vehicles, expensive luxury cars, sports cars and even smaller-than-human-sized objects.

In the Japanese version of the franchise, the Decepticons are called Destron or Deathtron ( Desutoron). The only exception to this naming convention is Car Robots, where the sub-group referred to as "Decepticons" in the Robots in Disguise adaptation, is known in Japan as the Combatrons (the Japanese name of the G1 subgroup known as the Combaticons).

As opposed to the Autobots' Supreme Commander, the Primes, the Decepticons' highest ranking leader is often given the title Emperor of Destruction in Japan. Beginning with the original Generation 1 cartoon, the Decepticon rallying cry has been "Decepticons attack!", as well as "Transform and rise up!" in Transformers: Animated as a play on the Autobots' "Transform and roll out!" rallying cry.

See also
 Autobot
 Predacon

References

Extraterrestrial supervillains
Fictional characters introduced in 1984
Fictional extraterrestrial robots
Fictional vehicles
Fictional warrior races
Galactic empires
Robot supervillains
Supervillain teams
Transformers characters
Villains in animated television series